Yana Dineva Dineva (born 8 November 2002) is a Bulgarian footballer who plays as a defender for the Bulgaria women's national team.

International career
Dineva capped for Bulgaria at senior level in a 0–6 friendly loss to Croatia on 14 June 2019.

International goals

References

2002 births
Living people
Women's association football defenders
Bulgarian women's footballers
Bulgaria women's international footballers